Damir Kojašević (Serbian Cyrillic: Дамир Којашевић; born 3 June 1987) is a Montenegrin professional footballer who plays as a winger for Iskra Danilovgrad and the Montenegro national team. 

While playing as a professional in Kazakhstan, Talgat Baysufinov called him "the little scoundrel", referring to his playing style on the field.

Club career

Early career
Kojašević signed his first professional contract with Montenegrin club Dečić at the age of 16. At the age of 18, he completed his first international transfer to Polish team Jagiellonia Białystok in 2008. At the age of 19, he was named the best foreign player in the Ekstraklasa. He left after a season due to a disagreement with the coach. He then returned to Montenegro and joined Zeta, with whom he played for three months.

Sarajevo
In 2010, Kojašević joined Bosnian team Sarajevo after being scouted by the club president at the time, Zijad Blekić. Over the course of two seasons with Sarajevo, he was considered to be one of the best players in the Premijer Liga. After the club told him they could not afford to pay his salary, Kojašević voluntarily terminated his contract. He subsequently joined Budućnost in a free transfer in January 2012, but played for them for only three months.

Astana
After only a brief period with Budućnost, Kojašević joined Kazakh side FC Astana in the spring of 2012. During his time with Astana, he enjoyed clubbing after games. In February 2015, Kojašević moved from Astana to Lokomotiv Tashkent on loan.

Mladost Podgorica
In August 2015, Kojašević turned down clubs from other countries to join Mladost Podgorica, citing family reasons. At Mladost his coach was Nikola Rakojević. In November 2015 he suffered a calf injury. Although he only spent a half-season at Mladost, Kojašević contributed to Mladost winning the league that season with seven goals.

Vardar
In December 2015, Kojašević signed with Vardar. He contributed in Vardar's first ever successful qualifying campaign to the 2017–18 UEFA Europa League, and played in their historic upset of heavily favored Fenerbahçe in front of an audience of 45,000 at the Şükrü Saracoğlu Stadium on 24 August 2017. Despite Vardar entering the Europa League group stage for the first time, Kojašević left the team before the group stage allegedly due to financial issues with club owner Sergey Samsonenko. Vardar ended up without a single win in Europa League Group L that season.

Vojvodina
In September 2017, Kojašević signed a one-year contract with Serbian club Vojvodina. On 29 September 2017, he scored two goals against Mladost Lučani. On 28 October 2017, he scored an olympic goal in a 3–0 win against Rad. On 3 December 2017, Kojašević scored a goal in a 1–1 tie against Partizan at their stadium in snowy conditions. In the half-season he played for Vojvodina, he scored four goals over the course of 14 matches. He was a teammate with Dušan Jovančić. Although he allegedly agreed to remain in Vojvodina for the remainder of the season, he terminated his contract in late January 2018.

Shakhter Karagandy
On 12 February 2018, Shakhter Karagandy announced the signing of Kojašević. At the time he joined, the team was coached by Uladzimir Zhuravel, with whom Kojašević worked well and got playing time. However, the team's record under Zhuravel experienced a period of losses in addition to Zhuravel's health problems. Later in 2018 Zhuravel was replaced by Nikolay Kostov, with whom Kojašević also saw playing time in addition to a significantly improved record during the season.

In August 2018, Kojašević went to the coal mine in Karaganda with the rest of the team. Although he was initially scared, the mine left a strong impression with him, as he had never gone down a mine before.

Radnički Niš
On 16 January 2019, Kojašević joined Serbian club Radnički Niš. Coach Nenad Lalatović had insisted on Kojašević's signing, referring to him as one of the best playmakers in the Serbian SuperLiga. On 29 January 2019, he scored his first goal for Radnički Niš in a 3-0 friendly win against Russian club Avangard. On 7 April 2019, he scored two goals in a 5–1 win against OFK Bačka.

Sutjeska Nikšić
On 14 June 2019, Kojašević signed a one-year contract with Montenegrin club Sutjeska Nikšić. On 10 July 2019, he scored a goal in a 1–1 tie against Slovan Bratislava in the first leg of the first qualifying round for the 2019–20 UEFA Champions League. On 6 August 2019, he scored from a free kick in a 1–2 loss against Linfield in the first leg of the third qualifying round for the 2019–20 UEFA Europa League.

International career
Kojašević was called up to the senior Montenegro squad for a friendly against Turkey in June 2016. However, he did not make his debut until substituting Marko Vešović in a match against Romania on 4 September 2016. Less than 10 minutes after coming on the field, Kojašević made an assist for teammate Stevan Jovetić, whose goal tied the game 1-1. On 27 March 2017, he made another assist for teammate Stefan Mugoša in his goal against Poland, although Montenegro ended up losing 1–2. As of September 2020, he has earned a total of 9 caps, scoring 1 goal.

Career statistics

International goals
Scores and results list Montenegro's goal tally first.

Honours

Club
Budućnost Podgorica
Montenegrin First League (1): 2011–12

Astana
 Kazakhstan Premier League (1): 2014
Kazakhstan Cup (1): 2012

Vardar
Macedonian First League (1): 2016–17

Notes

References

External links

1987 births
Living people
Footballers from Podgorica
Association football wingers
Montenegrin footballers
Montenegro international footballers
FK Dečić players
Jagiellonia Białystok players
Górnik Łęczna players
FK Zeta players
FK Sarajevo players
FK Budućnost Podgorica players
FC Astana players
PFC Lokomotiv Tashkent players
OFK Titograd players
FK Vardar players
FK Vojvodina players
FC Shakhter Karagandy players
FK Radnički Niš players
FK Sutjeska Nikšić players
KF Feronikeli players
Montenegrin First League players
Ekstraklasa players
I liga players
Premier League of Bosnia and Herzegovina players
Kazakhstan Premier League players
Uzbekistan Super League players
Macedonian First Football League players
Serbian SuperLiga players
Football Superleague of Kosovo players
Montenegrin expatriate footballers
Expatriate footballers in Poland
Montenegrin expatriate sportspeople in Poland
Expatriate footballers in Bosnia and Herzegovina
Montenegrin expatriate sportspeople in Bosnia and Herzegovina
Expatriate footballers in Kazakhstan
Montenegrin expatriate sportspeople in Kazakhstan
Expatriate footballers in Uzbekistan
Montenegrin expatriate sportspeople in Uzbekistan
Expatriate footballers in North Macedonia
Montenegrin expatriate sportspeople in North Macedonia
Expatriate footballers in Serbia
Montenegrin expatriate sportspeople in Serbia
Expatriate footballers in Kosovo
Montenegrin expatriate sportspeople in Kosovo